Ammirul Emmran bin Mazlan (born 18 April 1995) is a Singaporean professional footballer who plays as a midfielder for Singapore Premier League club Balestier Khalsa and the Singapore national team.

He won the inaugural Dollah Kassim Award for youth players in 2010.

Career 

Ammirul Emmran is a graduate of the National Football Academy. He was promoted to the national under-23 developmental side Courts Young Lions in 2014.

Ammirul Emmran represented the Singapore national under-14 team at the 2009 Asian Youth Games, and was part of the national under-15 team which won the bronze medal at the 2010 Summer Youth Olympics.

Career statistics

. Caps and goals may not be correct

 Young Lions are ineligible for qualification to AFC competitions in their respective leagues.

International Statistics

U19 International caps

Honours 
Singapore U15
 Summer Youth Olympics: bronze medalist, 2010

References

External links 
 

1995 births
Living people
Singaporean footballers
Association football midfielders
Singapore Premier League players
Young Lions FC players
Footballers at the 2010 Summer Youth Olympics
Competitors at the 2017 Southeast Asian Games
Southeast Asian Games competitors for Singapore